The first siege of Hachigata castle took place in 1568; Takeda Shingen laid siege to the Hachigata Castle, which was controlled by Hōjō Ujikuni, but was unable to capture it.  

After failed to capture Hachigata castle, Shingen then moved south to besiege Takiyama castle, on his way to the Hōjō capital of Odawara.

References
Turnbull, Stephen (1998). 'The Samurai Sourcebook'. London: Cassell & Co.

See also
Siege of Hachigata (1590)

Hachigata 1568
1568 in Japan
Conflicts in 1568
Hachigata